Airlock Alpha, formerly SyFy Portal, is an entertainment news website focusing on science-fiction, fantasy and comic book television series and films.

History
After a collaboration between Michael Hinman and Greg Boubel, the site debuted August 13, 1998, as "Syfyman's World", later renamed "SyFy World". In 2000, SyFy World became part of Trek Nation, the parent network of TrekToday. In 2001, the site merged with the Star Trek Portal website and relaunched as "SyFy Portal".

The website announced a rebranding under the new name of Airlock Alpha on February 23, 2009. No reason outside of a new marketing strategy was given for the name change at the time, but on March 16, 2009, Sci Fi Channel announced that it was changing its name to Syfy, and Airlock Alpha revealed that it had sold its former brand name to an undisclosed party a month earlier.

Current status

As of September 30, 2015, Airlock Alpha is uploading content and is online.
As of October 4, 2015, Airlock Alpha is back offline. Its site is still up, but it hasn't posted any information since.

Portal Awards 
Airlock Alpha created the Genre Awards in 1999, which has handed out awards for genre television and movies nearly every year since. It is based upon fan-based voting. The awards were later renamed as the Portal Awards.

Categories

References

American entertainment news websites
Internet properties established in 1998